Events in the year 1993 in  Israel.

Incumbents
 President of Israel – Chaim Herzog until 13 May, Ezer Weizman
 Prime Minister of Israel – Yitzhak Rabin (Israeli Labor Party)
 President of the Supreme Court – Meir Shamgar
 Chief of General Staff – Ehud Barak
 Government of Israel – 25th Government of Israel

Events

 24 March – The Knesset elects Ezer Weizman as President of Israel, by a majority of 66 to 53, against Dov Shilansky.
 13 May – Ezer Weizman assumes office as the seventh president of the State of Israel.
 15 May – Lehakat Shiru represents Israel at the Eurovision Song Contest with the song “Shiru” ("Sing").
 July – The 1993 Maccabiah Games are held.
 25 July – Operation Accountability: IDF forces launch a week-long attack in Lebanon with specified three purposes: to strike directly at Hezbollah; to make it difficult for Hezbollah to use southern Lebanon as a base for striking Israel; and to displace refugees in the hopes of pressuring the Lebanese government to intervene against Hezbollah.
 29 July – The Supreme Court of Israel acquits accused Nazi death camp guard John Demjanjuk of all charges and he is set free.
 18 August – The new Tel Aviv Central Bus Station opens to the public, after more than 25 years of construction.
 19 September – Michael Jackson performed in the Yarkon Park in a concert attended by 70,000 fans.
 4 November – The Israeli commercial television channel Channel 2 begins its broadcasting.
 30 December – Israel and the Vatican establish diplomatic relations.

Israeli–Palestinian conflict 

The most prominent events related to the Israeli–Palestinian conflict which occurred during 1993 include:

 20 August – The first agreement in the Oslo Accords is signed, between by Foreign Minister Shimon Peres for Israel, Mahmoud Abbas for the PLO and Secretary of State Warren Christopher for the United States.
 13 September – The Oslo Accords are officially signed at a public ceremony in Washington, DC in the presence of Israeli Prime Minister Yitzhak Rabin, PLO chairman Yasser Arafat and US President Bill Clinton.

Notable Palestinian militant operations against Israeli targets

The most prominent Palestinian Arab terror attacks committed against Israeli targets during 1993 include:

 16 April – Mehola Junction bombing: A Hamas militant carries out the first suicide bombing by Palestinian Arab militants from the Palestinian territories against Israeli targets. A Palestinian Arab bystander and the bomber are killed in the attack and seven IDF soldiers and a Palestinian Arab are injured.

Notable Israeli military operations against Palestinian militancy targets

The most prominent Israeli military counter-terrorism operations (military campaigns and military operations) carried out against Palestinian militants during 1993 include:

Notable births
 22 January – Netta Barzilai, Israeli singer, winner of the Eurovision Song Contest 2018.
 7 March – Shani Hazan, Israeli beauty pageant titleholder
 6 September – Rudy Rochman, Jewish-Israeli rights activist
 23 December – Shlomit Malka, Israeli model.

Notable deaths
 16 February – Amos Guttman (born 1954), Romanian-born Israeli film director.
 30 April – Frija Zoaretz (born 1907), Libyan-born Israeli politician.
 11 October – Nathan Rotenstreich (born 1914), Austro-Hungarian (Galicia)-born Israeli professor of philosophy.
 18 December – Emanuel Amiran (born 1909), Russian-born Israeli composer.
 Full date unknown – Benjamin Shapira (born 1913), German–born Israeli biochemist.

Major public holidays

See also
 1993 in Israeli film
 1993 in Israeli television
 1993 in Israeli music
 1993 in Israeli sport
 Israel in the Eurovision Song Contest 1993

External links

 IDF History in 1993 @ dover.idf.il

References